Ad. Baucau or Associação Desportiva Baucau is a football club of East Timor come from Baucau. The team plays in the Taça Digicel.

External links
 Ad. Baucau at National-Football-Teams.com

Football clubs in East Timor
Football
Baucau Municipality
Association football clubs established in 2010
2010 establishments in East Timor
 
Baucau